WMGX (93.1 MHz "Coast 93.1") is a commercial FM radio station in Portland, Maine. The station's coverage area reaches across most of Southern Maine and into portions of Southeastern New Hampshire. WMGX airs an Adult Top 40 radio format and is owned by Saga Communications.  Studios and offices are on Western Avenue in South Portland.

WMGX has an effective radiated power (ERP) of 50,000 watts.  The transmitter is off Presumpscot Street in Portland, near Interstate 295.  It broadcasts in the HD Radio hybrid format.  The HD2 subchannel carries the talk radio programming of sister station AM 560 WGAN.  And the HD3 subchannel carries the Bible Broadcasting Network's Christian radio programming, which feeds FM translator W286CU at 105.1 MHz in Saco, Maine.

History
On June 10, 1977, WMGX first signed on the air.  It was owned by Sunshine Broadcasting and played a soft rock format as "Magic 93."  Artists included James Taylor, Carole King, Cat Stevens and Carly Simon.  Announcers did not talk over the music.  Several songs were played in a row, with no talking between the songs.

From the mid-to-late-1980s and through the 1990s, WMGX was owned by the Portland Radio Group, LLC., which also operated talk radio station 560 AM WGAN, country music station 101.9 WPOR and "Oldies" (1950s and 1960s hits) station 100.9 WYNZ. WMGX had a unique format, blending classic, soft, and progressive rock with adult contemporary music. At this time, the station claimed that "[It] never [played] the same song twice [in one 24-hour period]," a boast that it later backed up with a monetary prize to anyone who caught the station doing so.

In 1992, WMGX and WGAN were acquired by Saga Communications.  On March 9, 2006, 29 years after the station's launch, WMGX changed format. The station then became "Coast 93.1," with a hot adult contemporary format, playing music from the "80s, 90s and Now".

WMGX eventually dropped the "80s, 90s and Now" slogan and changed it to "Today's Best Mix" in order to reflect the playlist from the current and recent Top 40 charts, minus any songs deemed too hard-edged or rap-oriented.  Songs from the last couple of decades also were heard but WMGX rarely played any song recorded before 1990.

As of April 2016, to compete more with the long dominant Top 40 station 97.9 WJBQ, WMGX shifted to an Adult Top 40 format under the branding of "Portland's Adult Hit Music Station." The station currently acts as a hybrid between a Hot AC and a Mainstream Top 40 station.  On Sunday mornings, WMGX airs the nationally syndicated show "American Top 40" with Ryan Seacrest.

The Blake Show (Coast Morning Show)
Portland's most popular morning show, the Blake Show with Kelly and Todd starts the day with laughs, fun, topical content, and relatable topics. The show features cohosts Blake Hayes and Kelly Towle. WCSH meteorologist, Todd Gutner, is a contributing third co-host.

Blake Hayes is open about being gay and sometimes discusses life as a gay man.

After 15 years with the station, former morning co-host Eva Matteson left the station in February 2020.

References

External links
 Station website

MGX
Adult top 40 radio stations in the United States
Radio stations established in 1977
1977 establishments in Maine